A component cause of a disease is an event required for the disease to develop.
Given a disease or medical condition, there is a causality chain of events from the first event to the appearance of the clinical disease
A cause of a disease event is an event that preceded the disease event in a disease causal chain. Without this antecedent event the disease event either would not have occurred at all or would not have occurred until some later time. However, no specific event is sufficient by itself to produce disease. Hence such an event is a component of a sufficient cause.

See also
Sufficient cause of the disease.

References

External links
Rothman and Greenland

Diseases and disorders